Maddin is a surname. Notable people with the surname include:

Edward Maddin (1852-1925), Canadian-American Navy sailor
Guy Maddin (born 1956), Canadian screenwriter
James William Maddin (1874-1961), Canadian lawyer and politician
Jim Maddin (born 1947/1948), Canadian politician
Thomas L. Maddin (1826-1908), American physician

See also
Madden (surname)
Madin (surname)